Zygaena haematina is a species of moth in the Zygaenidae family. It is found in Iran.

Z. haematina approaches Zygaena fraxini, but is much smaller and more narrow-winged, spot 4 is more rounded and there is a red collar, which is absent from fraxini. Rebel considers haematina a distinct species from an examination of the type contained in the Hofmuseum at Vienna: from Persia.

References

External links

Images representing Zygaena haematina at Bold

Moths described in 1849
Zygaena